Besnoitiosis is a protozoan disease of the skin, subcutis, blood vessels, mucous membranes, and other tissues" of animals. It "is endemic in tropical and sub-tropical regions with high infection rate but low mortality"; however, it is rare in other regions.

The causative organisms of the cutaneous disease, and the affected animals include:
 Besnoitia besnoiti in cattle (swelling of the lymph nodes, subcutaneous swellings, diarrhea, abortion and infertility)
 Besnoitia bennetti in horses and donkeys (characterized by a widespread, serious dermatitis)
 Besnoitia jellisoni  and B. wallacei in rodents
 Besnoitia tarandi in reindeer and caribou
 Besnoitia darlingi in lizards, opossums, and snakes
 Besnoitia sauriana in lizards
 Viscerotropic strains of B.besnoiti in African antelope
 An unidentified Besnoitia species in goats in Iran, New Zealand, and Kenya

References

Veterinary protozoology
Protozoal diseases